Richard Patrick (died 1566), of Huntingdon, was an English politician.

He was a Member (MP) of the Parliament of England for Huntingdon in 1559.

References

Year of birth missing
1566 deaths
People from Huntingdon
English MPs 1559